MIL-Davie Shipbuilding is a historic Canadian shipbuilding company that was located in both Sorel, Quebec (MIL) and Lauzon, Quebec (Davie).

In 1986, Marine Industries Limited merged with Davie Shipbuilding to become MIL-Davie Shipbuilding.

The company declared bankruptcy in the early 2000s due to a lack of contracts and sold to Norwegian interests TECO Maritime.

The Quebec facility, located on the St. Lawrence River across from Quebec City, was closed in 1997 and will be re-activated for a contract to be delivered in 2009 and renamed Davie Yards Incorporated.

Ships built 

Ferries
 MV Joseph and Clara Smallwood (1986)
 MV Caribou (1984)

Warships

See also

 Marine Industries Limited
 Davie Shipbuilding

Shipbuilding companies of Canada
Former defence companies of Canada
Defunct manufacturing companies of Canada